Ira Harry Morgan (2 April 1889 – 10 April 1959) was an American cinematographer. He successfully transitioned from silent movies to sound films. He filmed famed animal-trainer Frank Buck’s film Tiger Fangs (1943).

Early years
Morgan broke in as a cameraman with Gaumont News, a pioneer of newsreels. Later he was behind the camera when Essanay Films were made at Niles Canyon, Alameda County, where the old Bronco Billy series was produced. In 1919, he joined director King Vidor.

Later career
During his long career, Morgan worked extensively for major studios such as Paramount Pictures, Warner Bros., and Metro-Goldwyn-Mayer as well as independent producers. Notably, he worked with former Essanay colleague Roland Totheroh on Charles Chaplin's Modern Times (1936). Morgan ended his career with a long series of films at Monogram Pictures. His last credit was The Cyclops (1957), released by Allied Artists, successor to Monogram.

Other credits included George W. Hill's Tell It to the Marines (1926) with Lon Chaney, James Cruze's Washington Merry-Go-Round (1932) with Lee Tracy, Michael Curtiz's Jimmy the Gent (1934) with James Cagney, Frank Buck’s Tiger Fangs (1943), Johnny Doesn't Live Here Any More (1944), Jungle Jim (1948), The Lost Tribe (1949), Chain Gang (1950), and Revenue Agent (1950).

Partial filmography

 Enchantment (1921)
 Beauty's Worth (1922)
 Enemies of Women (1923)
 Tell It to the Marines (1926)
 The Taxi Dancer (1927)
 Spring Fever (1927)
 Buttons (1927)
 The Duke Steps Out (1929)
 The Great Gabbo (1929)
 Washington Merry-Go-Round (1932)
 The Unwritten Law (1932)
 Whistlin' Dan (1932)
 Son of a Sailor (1933)
 Jimmy the Gent (1934)
 A Girl of the Limberlost (1934)
 Redhead (1934)
 Lost in the Stratosphere (1934)
 Unknown Blonde (1934)
 Girl Overboard (1937)
 The Westland Case (1937)
 Damaged Goods (1937)
 Tiger Fangs (1943)
 Charlie Chan in the Secret Service (1944)
 Detective Kitty O'Day (1944)
 The Chinese Cat (1944)
 Johnny Doesn't Live Here Any More (1944)
 Sweethearts of the U.S.A. (1944)
 Docks of New York (1945)
 The Strange Mr. Gregory (1946)
 Jungle Jim (1948)
 The Lost Tribe (1949)
 The Mutineers (1949)
 The Blazing Trail (1949)
 Chain Gang (1950)
 Revenue Agent (1950)
 The Cyclops (1957)

References

External links

1889 births
1959 deaths
American cinematographers
People from Sonoma County, California